Copacabana: The Original Motion Picture Soundtrack Album is a 1985 soundtrack album by Barry Manilow released by RCA Records to accompany the made-for-television musical film Copacabana. It was Barry Manilow's first soundtrack that contained songs with music by him.

Track listing
note: all tracks composed by Barry Manilow (music), Bruce Sussman and Jack Feldman (lyrics).*

"Overture" – Orchestra
"Copacabana (At the Copa)" – Barry Manilow
"Let's Go Steppin'" – Chorus
"Changing My Tune" – Barry Manilow
"Blue" – Orchestra
"Lola" – Barry Manilow
"Who Needs to Dream" – Barry Manilow
"Man Wanted" – Annette O'Toole
"¡Aye Caramba!" – Chorus
"Call Me Mr. Lucky" – Barry Manilow
"Big City Blues" – Barry Manilow
"Sweet Heaven (I'm in Love Again)" – Barry Manilow
"El Bravo" – Annette O'Toole and Chorus
"Copacabana (At the Copa) 1985" – Barry Manilow
"Who Needs To Dream (Reprise)" – Barry Manilow
"¡Aye Caramba! (Reprise)" – Barry Manilow

Notes
 The track "Blue" is an instrumental version and "Big City Blues" a piano/vocal version of two songs that Manilow originally recorded on the album 2:00 AM Paradise Cafe.

Certifications

References

1985 soundtrack albums
Film soundtracks
Manilow
RCA Records soundtracks